Matt Reid and John-Patrick Smith were the defending champions but chose not to defend their title.

Max Purcell and Andrew Whittington won the title after defeating Ruben Gonzales and Christopher Rungkat 6–3, 2–6, [10–8] in the final.

Seeds

Draw

References
 Main Draw

Dunlop World Challenge - Men's Doubles
2017 Men's Doubles